Ann Dainton is a former female Welsh international lawn and indoor bowler.

Dainton competed in the singles at the 1986 Commonwealth Games in Edinburgh, Scotland and the fours event at the 1990 Commonwealth Games in Auckland, New Zealand.

Four years later she won a bronze medal at the 1994 Commonwealth Games in the pairs event with Janet Ackland.

She is a nine times national indoor champion (singles 1982, 1983 1985), (triples 1984, 1986, 1992, 2000) and (fours 1980, 2006).

References

Welsh female bowls players
Living people
Commonwealth Games medallists in lawn bowls
Commonwealth Games bronze medallists for Wales
Bowls players at the 1986 Commonwealth Games
Bowls players at the 1990 Commonwealth Games
Bowls players at the 1994 Commonwealth Games
Year of birth missing (living people)
Medallists at the 1994 Commonwealth Games